Sverre Anker Ousdal (born 18 July 1944) is a Norwegian actor born in Flekkefjord, Norway.

Biography
Ousdal made his debut in 1965 at Den Nationale Scene in Bergen. He worked at the Oslo Nye Teater between 1967 and 1970, and is since 1970 part of Norway's National Theatre ensemble.

He has had major roles in several TV-series like Grenseland (1980), Blodsbånd (1998, for which he was awarded an Amanda), Familjen (Swedish) and Deadline Torp (2005). He also received the Amanda Award in 1990 for his part in the NRK play Kreditorer. In 1997 he was made a Knight First Class of the Royal Norwegian Order of St Olav for his acting work.

Ousdal has had a number of major roles in Norwegian and Swedish films, including Karjolsteinen (1977), Orion's Belt (1985), Falsk som vatten (1985), Etter Rubicon (1987), and Insomnia. He has also appeared in US films like The Island at the Top of the World (1974) and in several British productions, most notably the serial The Last Place on Earth (1985), where he starred as polar explorer Roald Amundsen.

He is the father of actor Mads Ousdal.

Ousdal was diagnosed with cancer in 2008, and lost most of his eyesight due to a mistake made by surgeons during an operation to remove a tumour. He retired as an actor in November 2013, after playing the title role in a production of King Lear at the National Theatre in Oslo.

Selected filmography

The Greatest Gamble (1967)
Olsen-banden (1968)
Kanarifuglen (1973)
Den siste Fleksnes (1974)
Min Marion (1975)
Wives (1975)
Pøbel (1978)
Grenseland (1980)
Martin (1981)
Flight of the Eagle (1982)
Last Gleaming (1983)
The Chieftain (1984)
False as Water (1985)
Orion's Belt (1985)
Plastposen (1986)
A Film About Love (1987)
Etter Rubicon (1987)
Over grensen (1987)
Mio in the Land of Faraway (1987)
Folk og røvere i Kardemomme by (1988)
The Dive (1990)
The Last Dance (1993)
Kristin Lavransdatter (1995)
Hamsun (1996)
Insomnia (1997)
Eva's Eye (1999)
The 7 Deadly Sins (2000)
Familjen (2002)
Everyone Loves Alice (2002)
Kitchen Stories (2003)
The Crossing (2004)
Deadline Torp (2005)
The Secret Life of Words (2005)
Wide Blue Yonder (2010)

References

External links
 

1944 births
Living people
People from Flekkefjord
Norwegian male stage actors
Norwegian male television actors
Norwegian male film actors
20th-century Norwegian male actors
21st-century Norwegian male actors